Sarah Young (née Taylor; born 19 October 1981 in Canberra, Australian Capital Territory) is a female field hockey midfielder from Australia. She made her debut for the Australian women's national team during the 2001 season (Korea Telecom Cup). Young was a member of the Hockeyroos at the 2006 Commonwealth Games in Melbourne, where the team ended up in first place in the overall rankings.

References
 sports-reference
 Profile Australia Hockey

External links
 

1981 births
Living people
Australian female field hockey players
Olympic field hockey players of Australia
Field hockey players at the 2006 Commonwealth Games
Field hockey players at the 2008 Summer Olympics
Commonwealth Games gold medallists for Australia
Sportspeople from Canberra
Commonwealth Games medallists in field hockey
ACT Academy of Sport alumni
21st-century Australian women
Medallists at the 2006 Commonwealth Games